Volegalea dirki is a species of sea snail, a marine gastropod mollusk in the family Melongenidae, the crown conches and their allies.

Description
The maximum shell size of this species is 90 mm.

Distribution
This species occurs in the Indian Ocean off Southern India.

References

 Landau B. & Vermeij G.J. (2013) A new species of Pugilina (Gastropoda, Caenogastropoda, Melongeninae) from the Lower Miocene Cantaure Formation of Venezuela. Basteria 77(4-6): 89-95.

External links
 

 
Gastropods described in 2007